James Freemantle (born 1979)  is an English bibliographer, private press historian, printer and book-collector.

His official posts include as Chairman of the Private Libraries Association, Trustee and Honorary Secretary of Milton's Cottage, and Member of the Double Crown Club, for which he is also Dinner Secretary.

He has written for journals and magazines including The Private Library, Double Dagger, Parenthesis, Illustration and Matrix, amongst others and has published a book on the History of the Caradoc Press.

He has been a Judge at the Oxford Fine Press Fair, curated an exhibition on the Private Press editions of Milton's Paradise Lost, engaged in speaking engagements on the history of the book, including at the Court Barn Museum and before the Oxford Guild of Printers, and been interviewed by Printweek, Fine Books & Collectors and Intelligent Collector

James is also the proprietor of the St James Park Press, a Fine press printing by letterpress in London, England, whose work is in the collections of the National Art Library at the Victoria & Albert Museum, the Library at Tate Britain, and the Bodleian Library, and has been exhibited at Bath Spa University, the Museum of English Rural Life, and the University of York, amongst others.

Select writing 

 The 1931 Ashendene Press Daphnis & Chloe (The Private Library, 6th Series, Vol. 5:4, 2012)
 Vellum (The Private Library, 6th Series, Vol. 6:4, 2013)
 Golden Cockerel Press Flinders' Voyage (The Private Library, 6th Series, Vol. 7:1, 2014)
I. M. Imprimit (The Private Press Today (St Bride Exhibition), 2015)
Fine Press Report (Parenthesis, Journal of the Fine Press Book Association, Spring 2016, No. 30 (ed. Sebastian Carter)
The Engravings of Mark Arman (Matrix 34, Whittington Press, 2017)
The Caradoc Press (The Private Library, 6th Series, Vol. 9:1 & 2, 2017)
Paradise Lost and the Private Presses (2017)
The Diary of a Pressman (Double Dagger, Issue 2, Autumn 2017)
Collecting Whittington Posters (Matrix 35, Whittington Press, 2018)
Book Fair Report (Parenthesis, Spring 2019, No. 36)
The Art Society Press (Illustration, 2020)

Select St James Park Press publications 

The Twelve Labours of Hercules (St James Park Press, 2017) 
On the Birmingham School of Art, 1940 (St James Park Press, 2018) - see Eric Gill
An Albion in the Antarctic (St James Park Press, 2019) - the definitive study for Aurora Australis
King Arthur (St James Park Press, 2020)
Nineteen Eighty-Four (St James Park Press, 2021)

References

1979 births
English historians
English bibliographers
Living people